Hamid Ali Khan (27 January 1922 – 22 October 1998), better known by his stage name Ajit, was an Indian actor active in Hindi films. He acted in over two hundred movies over almost four decades. Ajit is also credited for starring as a lead actor in popular Bollywood movies such as Beqasoor, Nastik, Bada Bhai, Milan, Bara Dari, and later as a second lead in Mughal-e-Azam and Naya Daur.

Biography

Early life

Ajit was born as Hamid Ali Khan into a Deccani Muslim family of Hyderabad state near the historic fort of Golconda outside Hyderabad city. The family belonged to the Barozai clan of Pashtuns, Ajit's ancestors having moved from Kandahar in Afghanistan to Shahjahanpur in Uttar Pradesh before settling in Hyderabad.

Career
He struggled to meet people and be accepted in any project, and in order to feed himself, he worked as an "extra" in several films.

Finally, he managed to land a leading role, and in the first couple of films, he is credited in his real name, Hamid Khan. He did not meet with much success, and on the advise of Nana Bhai Bhat, he took the name "Ajit" meaning "indomitable" as his screen-name, but his luck did not greatly improve. Although he did several films as a protagonist and became known to the public, and although his distinctive baritone voice and impressive personality brought him a fan following, his luck at the box office was not good at all. Film director K. Amarnath, who directed him in Beqasoor, suggested that the actor change his long name of Hamid Ali Khan to something shorter, and Hamid zeroed in on "Ajit". Beqasoor, in which he acted with Madhubala, was one of the biggest hits of 1950. Ajit's films as hero include Nastik (1953), Bada Bhai, Milan, Baradari and Dholak, and in all of them, he did credible work as actor. In Nastik (1953), the song "Dekh tere sansar ki haalat kya ho gayi Bhagwan" is picturised on him. He moved quite soon to second-lead roles, which he accepted because he had no other source of income. These movies include Naya Daur and Mughal-e-Azam.

Ajit, who ran away from home to Mumbai after selling his college books, started his career in films in the 1940s. Luck did not favour him in the beginning. He began with the 1946 movie Shahe Misra, acting opposite Geeta Bose, and also did films such as Sikander (with Van Mala), Hatimtai (1947), Aap Beeti (with Khursheed), Sone Ki Chidiya (with Leela Kumari), Dholak (with Meena Shori) and Chanda Ki Chandni (with Monica Desai) as leading hero, but flopped. He did the most films (15) with Nalini Jaywant. Ajit switched over to play the villain. His first movie as a villain was Suraj, followed by films such as Zanjeer and Yaadon Ki Baaraat.

His famous dialogues included the "Mona darling" bit in Yaadon Ki Baraat, "Lily don't be silly" in Zanjeer and the one about a "Lion" in Kallicharan. Ajit's other well known films were Naya Daur, Nastik and Shikari to name only a few. In his four decades of film career, Ajit had acted along with the legendary Prithviraj Kapoor, Sohrab Modi, Amitabh Bachchan, I S Johar, Dilip Kumar, Dev Anand, Shammi Kapoor, Dharmendra and many actresses, both young and old.

In the mid-seventies he had acted in over 57 films, mostly as a villain. His dialogue delivery remains popular even to this date. His colleagues in the film industry — leading personalities who have acted with him, grown up seeing him in Mumbai — expressed deep sorrow over his death.

Writer Javed Akhtar, who scripted Zanjeer, said: "Like Bachchan, Ajit found a new image as villain after Zanjeer. He started a new innings in his career though he was an established hero in the fifties. His villainy started a new trend. Here was a new villain who was soft-spoken yet forceful. We wanted to give a different image to villainy which matched the hero."

Acting style
Ajit almost always portrayed the sophisticated, educated, well groomed evil mastermind, albeit heartless villain. Ajit was presented in striking western attire, the "bold" checked suits, matching overcoats, white leather shoes, wide sunglasses, jewellery accessories etc.  Given his stature as a senior artist, Ajit was usually the gang leader to second tier villains (such as Jeevan (actor), Prem Chopra, Ranjeet, Kader Khan and Sujit Kumar). He was rarely portrayed (in movie roles) doing any "dirty work" himself, rather relying on his army of henchmen for the task, with zero tolerance for any failures. He always had a savvy female accomplice, usually named "Mona." Acting in over 200 films, he specialized in playing suave villains with memorable catch-phrases delivered in now iconic Ajit-style nasal drawls such as "Mona, darling". Ajit also brought to fame the smuggler as the villain. In his movies, he is generally seen smuggling gold biscuits in or out of the country. It has also been noted that most of his gang members had Christian names like Robert, Michael and Peter. He pronounced "Robert" as "Rabbert." This also has been used for comic purposes in parodies. His favourite dialogue is- "Very smart"

It was the menacing voice he was most famous for. He is still remembered for bringing the most famous villains in the history of Indian cinema to life. His contemporaries include veteran actors like Amrish Puri, Amjad Khan, Pran and Prem Chopra. Some of his popularity in the present time is due to the innumerable jokes and parodies made on his famous lines by comedians.

Personal life
Ajit married three times. His first wife, whom he married after a brief love affair, was an Anglo-Indian and a Christian. The marriage was very short-lived and fell apart due to huge cultural differences and there were no children. Ajit married Shahida, a young lady of his own community and similar social background, in a match arranged by their parents in the usual Indian way. The marriage, which lasted till his death, was entirely harmonious and was blessed with three sons, namely Shahid Ali Khan, Zahid Ali Khan and Abid Ali Khan. Ajit then married a third time, and the name of his third wife was Sara/Sarah. The actor Jayant (better known as the father of actor Amjad Khan) took the initiative to facilitate this marriage. Ajit has a further two sons by his third wife name, Shezad Khan and Arbaaz Khan.

Ajit had a strong friendship with actor Rajendra Kumar. Apart from friendship, Ajit also credited Rajendra Kumar with advising and helping him to become a "leading villain" rather than a second-lead hero. Rajendra Kumar was instrumental in getting Ajit his first role as villain in the film Suraj.

Death
Ajit died of a sudden heart attack. The film industry was taken aback by the sudden death and lavished many tributes. 

Fellow "villain" Amrish Puri said Ajit's death is a sad loss to films. "Ajit developed his own style of acting and delivery of dialogue. We still remember his style of acting which is guidance to the new generation of actors." Another fellow villain, Prem Chopra, who starred with Ajit in many films including Jugnu, Chupa Rustom and Ram Balram as a father and son team, said Ajit was devoted in his work. "He had a subtle sense of humour. He was a cultured man. We had a common interest - reciting Urdu poetry."

New-generation villain Kiran Kumar was shocked to hear that "his Ajit uncle" had died. "Our relationship was more personal than professional. I must have been hardly eight or ten years when my father (Jeevan) used to take me to Paradise Bakery opposite which was Ajit's residence. Father would call him by his first name Hamid, and would call him down. Ajit would come down, wearing lungi and jaali banian to chat with my father."

Filmography

References

1922 births
1998 deaths
Male actors from Telangana
Indian male film actors
Male actors in Hindi cinema
20th-century Indian male actors
Indian people of Afghan descent